The Czech Republic and Taiwan (officially the Republic of China, shortly ROC) maintain unofficial relations since the recognition of the One-China policy of the People's Republic of China by Czechoslovakia from 1979. From 1931 until 1949, however, the First Czechoslovak Republic had international relations with the Republic of China and the Czech Republic maintains official relations with the People's Republic of China.

In the absence of official diplomatic relations, the Czech Republic is represented by the Czech Economic and Cultural Office in Taipei, and Taiwan by the Taipei Economic and Cultural Representative Office in Prague.

Economy

Taiwanese electronics manufacturer Foxconn runs its largest European operations in the Czech Republic, the company's European Union (EU) hub. The subsidiary, named Foxconn CZ, is by profit one of largest companies in the Czech Republic.

In August 2020, Czech Senate President Miloš Vystrčil traveled to Taiwan on an official visit to "promote business links" between the two countries.

Prague–Taipei relations

In August 1968, the ROC (then an internationally recognized entity of “China”) was among the ten members of the United Nations Security Council to condemn the Warsaw Pact invasion of Czechoslovakia led by the Soviet Union, the latter of whom opposed the resolution.

In 2019, Czech Republic–Taiwan relations warmed when the Prague city council under Mayor Zdeněk Hřib voted to cancel sister city relations with Beijing due to the unwillingness of Beijing to renegotiate the inclusion of a One-China policy clause. While respecting the policy itself, Prague deemed inappropriate to express national policy in a sister city agreement. In December 2019, Prague announced it plans to sign a sister city agreement with Taipei in 2020.

Diplomat exchanges
Jaroslav Kubera, President of the Senate of the Czech Republic, planned a visit to Taipei prior to his death, prompting threats of retaliation from China's Ministry of Foreign Affairs. Kubera's successor, Miloš Vystrčil, however, led a delegation to Taiwan that arrived in Taipei on August 31, 2020. While there, Vystrčil gave a speech, declaring "I am a Taiwanese," echoing John F. Kennedy's famous "I am a Berliner" speech. The People's Republic of China said that Vystrčil would "pay a heavy price" for visiting what it considers to be a renegade province. Meanwhile, the President of the Czech Republic said of the trip that “I consider it boyish provocation.”

In late October 2021, Taiwan's foreign minister Joseph Wu receives a medal from the President of the Czech Senate Miloš Vystrčil.

Health
In March 2020, the Czech Republic and Taiwan signed an official partnership to fight COVID-19, the first such agreement signed by Taiwan.

In April 2021, Taiwan's foreign ministry thanked the Czech Republic for supporting Taiwan's bid to participate in World Health Assembly. The Czech Senate unanimously passed a resolution calling for Taiwan to take part in all divisions of the World Health Organization. It's the first time such a motion has progressed in a legislative chamber in the country.

After 2021 South Moravia tornado, Taiwan donated 6.5 million Czech koruna to the affected villages.

In August 2021, Taiwan received 30,000 Moderna vaccine donated by Czech Republic.

See also
Government of the Republic of China
China–European Union relations
China–Czech Republic relations
Foreign relations of Taiwan
Foreign relations of the Czech Republic
List of diplomatic missions of the Czech Republic

References

External links 
Czech Economic and Cultural Office
Taipei Economic and Cultural Office in the Czech Republic 

 
Czech Republic
Bilateral relations of the Czech Republic